Kiara Bisaro (born 12 November 1975) is a Canadian mountain biker.

Bisaro participated in the 2004 Summer Olympics in Athens coming 15th in the women's cross-country event.

She won a bronze medal at the 2006 Commonwealth Games in the cross-country event.

References

1975 births
Living people
Canadian female cyclists
Canadian mountain bikers
Sportspeople from British Columbia
Olympic cyclists of Canada
Cyclists at the 2004 Summer Olympics
Cyclists at the 2006 Commonwealth Games
Commonwealth Games bronze medallists for Canada
Commonwealth Games medallists in cycling
Medallists at the 2006 Commonwealth Games